HMS Tartar was a 28-gun sixth-rate frigate of the Royal Navy.

Naval career

The ship was first commissioned in March 1756 under Captain John Lockhart, and earned a reputation as a fast sailer during service in the English Channel. She made many captures of French ships during the Seven Years' War, including 4 in 1756 and 7 the following year.

During the peace that followed, the ship sailed to Barbados carrying a timekeeper built by John Harrison, as a part of a series of experiments used to determine longitude at sea.  

She also served in the American Revolutionary War, destroying an American vessel off New Jersey 1 April 1777 and capturing the Spanish Santa Margarita of 28 guns off Cape Finisterre on 11 November 1779.

She went on to see further service during the French Revolutionary War. On 14 December the French frigate  captured off the island of Ivica the collier Hannibal, which was sailing from Liverpool to Naples. However, eleven days later, Tartar recaptured Hannibal off Toulon and sent her into Corsica.

Tartar was part of the fleet under Lord Hood that occupied Toulon in August 1793. Once the forts were secure, the remainder of Hood's fleet, accompanied by 17 Spanish ships-of-the-line which had just arrived, sailed into the harbour.
Tartar was wrecked off Saint-Domingue on 1 April 1797.

Notes

References

Bibliography
 Robert Gardiner, The First Frigates, Conway Maritime Press, London 1992. .
 
 Rif Winfield, British Warships in the Age of Sail, 1714 to 1792, Seaforth Publishing, London 2007. .

External links
 

1756 ships
Ships built in Rotherhithe
Sixth-rate frigates of the Royal Navy